Tingberg or Øyer is the administrative centre of Øyer Municipality in Innlandet county, Norway. The village is located in the Gudbrandsdal valley, along the Gudbrandsdalslågen river in the southern part of the municipality.

The village is the site of Øyer Church which serves the southern part of the municipality.

References

Øyer
Villages in Innlandet
Populated places on the Gudbrandsdalslågen